Hani Ismaeel Al-Sebyani (born 21 July 1999) is a Saudi professional footballer who plays as a left back for Pro League side Al-Khaleej on loan from Al-Ahli.

Career
Al-Sebyani began his career at the youth team of Al-Ahli. On 4 August 2019, Al-Sebyani joined Pro League side Al-Fayha on loan for the 2019–20 season. On 30 May 2021, Al-Sebyani renewed his contract with Al-Ahli until 2024. On 31 August 2022, Al-Sebyani joined Al-Khaleej on loan.

References

External links

1999 births
Living people
Association football fullbacks
Saudi Arabian footballers
Saudi Arabia youth international footballers
Al-Ahli Saudi FC players
Al-Fayha FC players
Khaleej FC players
Saudi Professional League players
Saudi First Division League players